Bloods  is a British television sitcom created by Samson Kayo and Nathan Bryon in 2021 that airs on Sky Comedy.  The show is an ensemble comedy that stars Kayo and Jane Horrocks as South London paramedics, as they deal with emergency medical calls.

Cast
 
 Jane Horrocks as Wendy
 Samson Kayo as Maleek
 Lucy Punch as Jo
 Julian Barratt as Lawrence
 Katherine Kelly as George
 Adrian Scarborough as Gary
 Aasiya Shah as Kareshma
 Kevin Garry (as Kevin 'KG' Garry) as Darryl
 Sam Campbell as Darrell
 Ellie White as Radio (Voice)
 Nathan Foad as Spencer

Situation
A South London "mismatched", "eccentric", "(mostly) likeable", paramedic team, at an ambulance depot.

Distribution
Samson Kayo made a Comedy Short for Sky titled New Bloods in 2018; off the back of this, the first series was commissioned, with it airing from May 2021.

On 16 March 2022, Bloods, series 2, first group of 5 episodes began showing on Sky Comedy. The 10 episodes are split into two groups of five episodes. Bloods second group of 5 episodes began showing on 1 September on Sky Comedy and NOW. Each episode lasts less than 25 minutes.

A 3rd series was confirmed in October 2022, before the show was announced as cancelled less than a week later, despite the show being nominated for numerous awards, including 3 BAFTA nominations.

Critical response
Sean O'Grady for The Independent gave the show five stars, calling it "A magnificent paramedic comedy full of gallows humour". 
It is rated 100% Fresh on Rotten Tomatoes.

Conversely, Lucy Mangan for The Guardian gave the series three out of five stars, arguing that "the charm of Kayo and Horrocks make the otherwise laugh-free show worth watching"

Bloods was nominated for two Royal Television Society scripted comedy awards, and 3 BAFTA awards. Series 2 was nominated for the prestigious Rose D'or award in 2022.

References

External links
 

2021 British television series debuts
2020s British medical television series
2020s British workplace comedy television series
English-language television shows
Sky sitcoms